Amanda Díaz is a Puerto Rican beauty pageant titleholder.

References

1984 births
Living people
Puerto Rican beauty pageant winners